Betampona is a rural commune in Madagascar. It belongs to the district of Fenerive Est, which is a part of Analanjirofo Region. 

The population of the commune was estimated to be approximately 8,562 inhabitants in 2018.
This commune was split off Fenoarivo Atsinanana (Fenerive Est) only in 2015.

Nature
Betampona Reserve

References

Populated places in Analanjirofo